Diego Sosa (born 24 October 1991) is an Argentine professional footballer who plays as a midfielder for San Martín de Tucumán, on loan from Argentinos Juniors.

Career
Sosa began his career in Torneo Argentino B with Grupo Universitario, scoring thirteen goals in ninety-four appearances in four years with the club. In 2013, Sosa joined fellow Torneo Argentino A team Tiro Federal. Three goals in fifteen matches followed. Argentine Primera División side Olimpo completed the signing of Sosa in September 2014. He made his professional debut against Racing Club on 25 October, which was the first of three appearances for Olimpo in the 2014 season. Sosa was selected in just one match in 2015, which preceded the midfielder departing to join Santamarina ahead of the 2016 Primera B Nacional campaign.

His first goal in professional football arrived on 11 April 2016 during a win over Gimnasia y Esgrima. On 1 August 2017, Sosa signed for Boca Unidos of Primera B Nacional. After netting three times in twenty-three fixtures in 2017–18 as the club were relegated, Sosa agreed to join Argentine Primera División team Godoy Cruz in July 2018.

In July 2019, Sosa moved to fellow league club Argentinos Juniors, signing a one-year deal. In January 2022, he was loaned out to San Martín de Tucumán until the end of the year.

Career statistics
.

References

External links

1991 births
Living people
People from Tandil
Argentine footballers
Association football midfielders
Torneo Argentino B players
Argentine Primera División players
Primera Nacional players
Grupo Universitario de Tandil players
Olimpo footballers
Club y Biblioteca Ramón Santamarina footballers
Boca Unidos footballers
Godoy Cruz Antonio Tomba footballers
Argentinos Juniors footballers
San Martín de Tucumán footballers
Sportspeople from Buenos Aires Province